Teksla Island (called Norris Island in Australia) is the largest island in the Colbeck Archipelago near the coast of Mac. Robertson Land, 1 nautical mile (1.9 km) north of Chapman Ridge. Mapped by Norwegian cartographers from aerial photographs taken by the Lars Christensen Expedition, 1936–37, and named Teksla (the coopers axe).

See also 
 List of Antarctic and sub-Antarctic islands

References 

Islands of Mac. Robertson Land